The 2005 Western Australian retail trading hours referendum was held in Western Australia on 20 February 2005. The referendum failed, with a majority voting against both extended weeknight retail trading and Sunday retail trading.

Questions

Question 1 
Do you believe that the Western Australian community would benefit if trading hours in the Perth Metropolitan Area were extended to allow general retail shops to trade until 9 pm Monday to Friday?

Question 2 
Do you believe that the Western Australian community would benefit if trading hours in the Perth Metropolitan Area were extended to allow general retail shops to trade for 6 hours on Sunday?

Results

Weeknight trading

Sunday trading 

2005
2005 elections in Australia
2005 referendums
2000s in Western Australia
February 2005 events in Australia